Sir John Walter Nicholls  (4 October 1909 – 25 October 1970) was a British diplomat who was ambassador to Israel, Yugoslavia, Belgium and South Africa.

Biography
Nicholls was educated at Malvern College and Pembroke College, Cambridge. He joined the Foreign Office with the rank of third secretary in 1932. In 1939 he was seconded to the Ministry of Economic Warfare and was appointed OBE for his work there in the 1941 Birthday Honours. He was Commercial Counsellor in the British embassy at Lisbon 1943-1944, in the Control Commission for Austria 1944–46, Head of the Supply and Relief Department at the Foreign Office 1946-47, Head of German Trade/Commercial and Industry Department, at the Foreign Office 1947-49, Minister at Moscow 1949-51, Assistant Under-Secretary of State at the Foreign Office 1951–54, ambassador to Israel 1954–57, ambassador to Yugoslavia 1957–60, ambassador to Belgium 1960–63, Deputy Under-Secretary of State at the Foreign Office 1963–66, and ambassador to South Africa 1966–69.

Nicholls was appointed CMG in the 1948 Birthday Honours, knighted KCMG in the 1956 New Year Honours and raised to GCMG in the 1970 New Year Honours.

Offices held

References

External links

1909 births
1970 deaths
People educated at Malvern College
Alumni of Pembroke College, Cambridge
Members of HM Diplomatic Service
Ambassadors of the United Kingdom to Israel
Ambassadors of the United Kingdom to Yugoslavia
Ambassadors of the United Kingdom to Belgium
Ambassadors and High Commissioners of the United Kingdom to South Africa
Knights Grand Cross of the Order of St Michael and St George
Officers of the Order of the British Empire